Conorfone (INN; TR-5109), also known as conorphone and codorphone, as well as conorphone hydrochloride (USAN), is an opioid analgesic that was never marketed. It is an analogue of hydrocodone substituted with an 8-ethyl group and an N-cyclopropylmethyl group. It acts as a mixed agonist-antagonist at the μ-opioid receptor, and is slightly more potent than codeine in analgesic effects but associated with somewhat greater side effects.

Synthesis

Exposure of thebaine (1) to mild acid leads to hydrolysis of the enol ether function followed by migration of the double bond to yield the conjugated enone (2). Addition of lithium diethylcuprate proceeds by 1,4-addition from the less hindered side to give the intermediate 3. Treatment of that with cyanogen bromide under von Braun reaction conditions leads to the isolable aminocyanide. This is the converted to the secondary amine (4) by treatment with aqueous base. Alkylation of that intermediate with cyclopropylmethyl chloride affords the analgesic codorphone (5).

See also 
 Hydrocodone

References 

Analgesics
Cyclopropanes
Ketones
4,5-Epoxymorphinans
Mu-opioid receptor agonists
Catechol ethers
Semisynthetic opioids